Blue Bird Lake, Hisar is a resident and endangered migratory bird wetland habitat, lake and recreation area in the town of Hisar, in the Hisar district of Haryana State, India.

Location
Blue Bird Lake is close to Hisar Airport on NH-9 in Hisar, Haryana, India. It is close to Deer Park, Hisar and Shatavar Vatika Herbal Park, Hisar, both of which are run by the Forests Department, Haryana of Government of Haryana.

Migratory birds

Among approximately 1,800 migratory bird species out of total 10,000 species of birds in the world, nearly 370 species migrate to India due to seasonal changes, including 175 long-distance migration species that use the Central Asian Flyway route, and among those some of these migratory birds species have been sighted nesting here during the winter, many of which are endangered species.

The lake is also leased out for the commercial fisheries by Fisheries Department of Government of Haryana.

Attractions and facilities
The lake and surrounding wetland and parks are spread across 52 acres. The lake itself is 20 acres and has small islands where migratory birds and other flora and fauna live and nest.

There are boats available for hire, along with safety gear such as life saving flotation jackets and devices. The lake has floating pontoon platforms for visitors and boaters, and ghats for sitting and relaxing. Recreational fishing is permitted with payment of a licensing fee. Landscaped parks, sight-seeing walking trails and jogging tracks, over-water bridges, bush land, children's swings and play area, visitor's car park and toilets, and other amenities are available. There is no entry fee to use these areas. The Blue bird lake also has government-run "Blue Bird Tourist Resort" with rooms, conference halls, restaurant and bar.

Conservation issues 

Air, sound and water pollution, lack of water supply and conservation, lack of protected area status and scientific wildlife management plan for wildlife conservation, lack of area development with scientific landscaping and tree planting conducive to safe  birds nesting and breeding, stray dogs and cats posing risk to nesting endangered birds, poor hygiene resulting in ongoing risk of avian flu outbreak, etc. remain major issues.

Since there is no agreement between Haryana Tourism that manages the wetland and HLRDC in control of canal that irrigates their farm in the vicinity of wetland, HLRDC stopped the supply of their share of water flowing to Blue bird lake, causing gradual reduction of water levels in the wetland which resulted in death of fishes in 2016.

Over 800 domesticated ducks resident at blue bird lake were culled by the authorities in November 2016 when 9 dead ducks were found that were confirmed to have died due to H5N8 avian influenza virus.

Nearby attraction

 Shatavar Vatika Herbal Park, Hisar is next to the Deer Park on Dhansu Road
 Kanwari Indus Valley Mound at Kanwari
 Tosham rock inscription at Tosham
 Asigarh Fort at Hansi
 Firoz Shah Palace Complex 
 Pranpir Badshah tomb at Hisar
 Mahabir Stadium
 Deer Park, Hisar
 Haryana Tourism

See also

 National Parks & Wildlife Sanctuaries of Haryana
 Indian Council of Forestry Research and Education
 Arid Forest Research Institute
 Okhla Sanctuary, bordering Delhi in adjoining Uttar Pradesh
 Najafgarh drain bird sanctuary, Delhi
 Najafgarh lake or Najafgarh jheel (Now completely drained by Najafgarh drain)
 National Zoological Park Delhi
 Asola Bhatti Wildlife Sanctuary, Delhi
 Bhalswa horseshoe lake, Delhi
 Bhindawas Wildlife Sanctuary
 Basai wetland
 Haryana Tourism
 List of Monuments of National Importance in Haryana
 List of State Protected Monuments in Haryana
 List of Indus Valley Civilization sites in Haryana, Punjab, Rajasthan, Gujarat, India & Pakistan
 List of national parks of India
 Wildlife sanctuaries of India

References

Lakes of Haryana
Wildlife sanctuaries in Haryana
Protected areas of Haryana
Hisar (city)
Wetlands of India
Bird sanctuaries of India